Raymer is a surname. Notable people with the surname include:

Beth Raymer (born 1976), American writer and journalist
Brent Raymer (born 1985), NASCAR driver
Cory Raymer (born 1973), American football player
Daniel Raymer, American aerospace engineer
Fred Raymer (1875–1957), American baseball player
Greg Raymer (born 1964), American poker player
Rick Raymer, American video game designer
Robert Raymer (born 1956), American writer
Steve Raymer, American journalist
Vic Raymer, Canadian curler

English-language surnames